Going My Way is a 1944 American musical comedy drama film directed by Leo McCarey and starring Bing Crosby and Barry Fitzgerald. Written by Frank Butler and Frank Cavett based on a story by McCarey, the film is about a new young priest taking over a parish from an established old veteran. Crosby sings five songs with other songs performed onscreen by Metropolitan Opera's star mezzo-soprano Risë Stevens and the Robert Mitchell Boys Choir. Going My Way was followed the next year by a sequel, The Bells of St. Mary's.

Going My Way was the highest-grossing picture of 1944, and was nominated for ten Academy Awards, winning seven, including Best Picture. Its success helped to make movie exhibitors choose Crosby as the biggest box-office draw of the year, a record he would hold for the remainder of the 1940s. After World War II, Crosby and McCarey presented a copy of the film to Pope Pius XII at the Vatican.

Plot
Father Charles "Chuck" O'Malley  (Bing Crosby), an incoming priest from East St. Louis, is transferred to St. Dominic's Church in New York City.

On his first day, his unconventional style gets him into a series of mishaps; his informal appearance and attitude make a poor impression with the elder pastor, Father Fitzgibbon (Barry Fitzgerald). The very traditional Fitzgibbon is further put off by O'Malley's recreational habits – particularly his golf-playing – and his friendship with the even more casual Father Timmy O'Dowd (Frank McHugh). O'Dowd tricks O'Malley into revealing that the bishop actually sent him to take charge of the parish's affairs, with Fitzgibbon remaining on as pastor. To spare Fitzgibbon's feelings, O'Malley acts as if he is simply his assistant.

The difference between O'Malley and Fitzgibbon's styles is openly apparent as they deal with events like a parishioner being evicted and a young woman named Carol James (Jean Heather) having run away from home. The most consequential difference arises in their handling of the church youth, many of whom consistently get into trouble with the law in a gang led by Tony Scaponi (Stanley Clements). Fitzgibbon is inclined to look the other way, siding with the boys because of their frequent church attendance. O'Malley seeks to make inroads into the boys' lives, befriending Scaponi and eventually convincing the boys to become a church choir.

The noise of the practicing choir annoys Fitzgibbon, who goes to the bishop and asks for O'Malley to be transferred away. In the course of the conversation, Fitzgibbon infers the bishop's intention to put O'Malley in charge of the parish. To avoid an uncomfortable situation, Fitzgibbon asks the bishop to put O'Malley in charge, and then, resigned to his fate, he informs O'Malley of his new role.  A distressed Fitzgibbon runs away in a rainstorm, returning late that night. O'Malley puts the older priest to bed, and the two begin to bond. They discuss Fitzgibbon's long-put-off desire to go to Ireland and see his mother, now over 90 years old. O'Malley puts Fitzgibbon to sleep with an Irish lullaby, "Too Ra Loo Ra Loo Ral".

O'Malley runs into Jenny Tuffel (Risë Stevens), an old girlfriend whom he left to join the priesthood. Jenny now has a successful career with the Metropolitan Opera, performing under the stage name Genevieve Linden. As she prepares to go onstage as the lead in a performance of Carmen, the two discuss their past, and she learns that her world travels with a previous opera company caused her to miss his letter explaining he had entered the priesthood.

O'Malley next pays a visit to Carol, now suspected of living in sin with Ted Haines Jr. (James Brown), the son of the church's mortgage holder. O'Malley describes to the young couple his calling in life, to follow the joyous side of religion and lead others to do the same, sung as his composition "Going My Way".  When the junior Haines is later confronted by his father, the father discovers that he and Carol have married, and he has joined the Air Force.

Jenny visits O'Malley at the church, sees the boys' choir, and reads the sheet music of "Going My Way". She, O'Malley, and O'Dowd devise a plan to rent out the Metropolitan, have the choir perform it with a full orchestra, then sell the rights to the song, saving the church from its financial woes. When Max Dolan (William Frawley), the music executive brought on to hear the song does not believe it will sell, the choir decides to make the most of its opportunity on the grand stage, and sings "Swinging on a Star". The executive overhears and decides to buy it, providing enough money to pay off the church mortgage.

With everything settled, O'Malley is transferred to a new assignment; O'Dowd will be Fitzgibbon's new assistant, with Tony Scaponi in charge of the choir. However, the church is damaged by a massive fire. On Christmas Eve, parishioners gather in a temporary church for a Mass that also serves as O'Malley's farewell. O'Malley sent for Fitzgibbon's mother (Adeline De Walt Reynolds) from Ireland as a parting gesture. As mother and son embrace for the first time in 45 years, the choir sings "Too-ra-loo-ra-loo-ral", as Father O'Malley quietly slips away into the night.

Cast

 Bing Crosby as Father Chuck O'Malley
 Barry Fitzgerald as Father Fitzgibbon
 Frank McHugh as Father Timothy O'Dowd
 James Brown as Ted Haines Jr.
 Gene Lockhart as Ted Haines Sr.
 Jean Heather as Carol James
 Porter Hall as Mr. Belknap
 Fortunio Bonanova as Tomaso Bozanni
 Eily Malyon as Mrs. Carmody
 Robert Mitchell Boychoir as St. Dominic's Church Choir 
 Risë Stevens as Genevieve Linden/Jenny Tuffel (credited as Famous Contralto of Metropolitan Opera Association)

Production

Risë Stevens, whose character is seen onscreen performing the lead role in a Metropolitan Opera (the Met) production of Carmen, was an actual performer with the Met when the film was made. A few years later she would earn enormous personal triumph as the Met's Carmen in the famous Tyrone Guthrie production of 1951, becoming the leading Carmen of her generation.

Filming locations included the following:
 Lakeside Country Club, 4500 W. Lakeside Drive, Toluca Lake, Los Angeles, California (golf sequences)
 Paramount Studios, 5555 Melrose Avenue, Hollywood, Los Angeles, California (studio)
 St. Monica Catholic Church, Santa Monica, California (St. Dominic's)
 Shrine Auditorium, Los Angeles, California (parking lot)

Reception
According to Bosley Crowther in The New York Times, Going My Way was "the best" of Crosby's career, which is "saying a lot for a performer who has been one of the steadiest joys of the screen. But, in this Leo McCarey film ... he has definitely found his sturdiest role to date." Crowther, however, criticized the film's length while lauding Crosby, and wrote that "he has been stunningly supported by Barry Fitzgerald, who plays one of the warmest characters the screen has ever known. As a matter of fact, it is a cruel slight to suggest that this is Mr. Crosby's show. It is his and Mr. Fitzgerald's together. And they make it one of the rare delights of the year."

Variety liked the film, saying: "Bing Crosby gets a tailor-made role in Going My Way, and with major assistance from Barry Fitzgerald and Risë Stevens, clicks solidly to provide top-notch entertainment for wide audience appeal. Picture will hit hefty biz on all booking ...  Intimate scenes between Crosby and Fitzgerald dominate throughout, with both providing slick characterizations ...  Crosby’s song numbers include three new tunes by Johnny Burke and James Van Heusen — 'Going My Way,' 'Would You Like to Swing on a Star' and 'Day After Forever.' Trio are topgrade and due for wide pop appeal due to cinch recording and airings by Bing. He also delivers 'Ave Maria,' 'Adeste Fideles' and 'Silent Night' in addition to a lively Irish-themed song, 'Toora-loora-looral' with boys' choir accompaniment."

Accolades
The film received ten Academy Award nominations at the 1944 ceremony, including two for Barry Fitzgerald (whose work on the film was nominated for both Best Actor and Best Supporting Actor). Bing Crosby won for Best Actor, while Fitzgerald won for Best Supporting Actor. (Subsequently, the rules were changed to prevent a recurrence).

In 2004, Going My Way was selected for preservation in the United States National Film Registry by the Library of Congress as being "culturally, historically, or aesthetically significant".

Soundtrack
 "The Day After Forever" (Jimmy Van Heusen / Johnny Burke) sung by Bing Crosby and Jean Heather, and again by Jean Heather.
 "Three Blind Mice" sung by Bing Crosby and the Robert Mitchell Boys Choir (credited onscreen as Robert Mitchell Boychoir)
 "Silent Night" sung by Bing Crosby and the Robert Mitchell Boys Choir
 "Too-Ra-Loo-Ra-Loo-Ral (That's an Irish Lullaby)" sung by Bing Crosby
 "Recitative and Habanera from Act 1 of "Carmen" sung by Risë Stevens
 "Going My Way" (Jimmy Van Heusen / Johnny Burke) sung by Bing Crosby, and again by Risë Stevens and the Robert Mitchell Boys Choir
 "Ave Maria" (Schubert) sung by Bing Crosby, Risë Stevens and the Robert Mitchell Boys Choir
 "Swinging on a Star" (Jimmy Van Heusen / Johnny Burke) sung by Bing Crosby and the Robert Mitchell Boys Choir

Bing Crosby recorded six of the songs for Decca Records and some of them were issued on a 3-disc 78rpm set titled Selections from Going My Way. “Swinging on a Star” topped the Billboard charts for nine weeks in a 28-week stay. "Too-Ra-Loo-Ra-Loo-Ral (That's an Irish Lullaby)" was in the charts for twelve weeks with a peak position of #4. "The Day After Forever" and "Going My Way" also charted briefly. Crosby's songs were also included in the Bing's Hollywood series.

Adaptations

Going My Way was adapted as a radio play for the January 8, 1945, broadcast of The Screen Guild Theater starring Bing Crosby, Barry Fitzgerald and Paul Lukas. It was also adapted for the May 3, 1954, broadcast of Lux Radio Theatre with Barry Fitzgerald.

The film also inspired an hour-long comedy drama of the same name during the 1962–63 television season starring Gene Kelly in the role of Father O'Malley. The series ran on ABC for one season of 30 episodes.

See also
 List of American films of 1944
 List of Christmas films

References

External links

 
 
 
 
 
 Going My Way essay by Daniel Eagan in America's Film Legacy: The Authoritative Guide to the Landmark Movies in the National Film Registry, A&C Black, 2010 , pages 373-374 

1944 films
1944 comedy-drama films
1944 musical films
1940s English-language films
1940s musical comedy-drama films
American black-and-white films
American musical comedy-drama films
Best Drama Picture Golden Globe winners
Best Picture Academy Award winners
Films about Catholicism
Films about Christianity
Films about Catholic priests
Films about Irish-American culture
Films adapted into television shows
Films directed by Leo McCarey
Films featuring a Best Actor Academy Award-winning performance
Films featuring a Best Supporting Actor Academy Award-winning performance
Films featuring a Best Supporting Actor Golden Globe winning performance
Films scored by Robert Emmett Dolan
Films set in New York City
Films that won the Academy Award for Best Story
Films that won the Best Original Song Academy Award
Films whose director won the Best Directing Academy Award
Films whose director won the Best Director Golden Globe
Films whose writer won the Best Adapted Screenplay Academy Award
Paramount Pictures films
Photoplay Awards film of the year winners
United States National Film Registry films
1940s American films